Emma Lou Diemer (born November 24, 1927 in Kansas City, Missouri) is an American composer.

Diemer has written many works for orchestra, chamber ensemble, keyboard, voice, chorus, and electronic media.  Diemer is a keyboard performer and over the years has given concerts of her own organ works at Washington National Cathedral, The Cathedral of Our Lady of the Angels in Los Angeles, Grace Cathedral and St. Mary's Cathedral in San Francisco, and others.

Works include many collections and single pieces for organ as well as many for solo piano, piano 4 hands, and two pianos. Her major chamber works include a piano quartet, string quartet, two piano trios, and sonatas and suites for flute, violin, cello, and piano as well as settings of the psalms for organ with other instruments.  Diemer has written many choral works as well. She has written numerous hymns, several of which appear in church hymnals. Her songs number in the dozens, using texts by many contemporary and early poets including Walt Whitman, Amy Lowell, Sara Teasdale, Alice Meynell, Thomas Campion, Shakespeare, John Donne, her sister Dorothy Diemer Hendry, Emily Dickinson, Robert Lowell, and many others.

Diemer's compositional style over the years has varied from tonal to atonal, from traditional to experimental. She has written works for non-professional and professional performers, originally under the "Gebrauchsmusik" philosophy, but has produced many works, particularly for keyboard, that are difficult and challenging. The latter category includes her "Fantasy" for piano; Seven Etudes for piano; Homage to Cowell, Cage, Crumb, and Czerny for two pianos; Variations for Piano Four Hands (Homage to Ravel, Schoenberg, and May Aufderheide); Four Biblical Settings for organ, Concerto for Organ ("Alaska"); and many psalm setting collections. The totally serial "Declarations" for organ (1973) contrasts to the more tonal 2013 concerto for violin and orchestra "Summer Day".  Her work in the electronic field during her years on the faculty of the University of California influenced a number of works including her Toccata for piano that has a number of performances on YouTube.

Academics
Diemer received both her B.M. and her M.M from the Yale School of Music in 1949 and 1950, respectively. She then went on to study composition in Brussels, Belgium on a Fulbright Scholarship from 1952 to 1953, ultimately returning to the United States to receive her Ph.D from the Eastman School of Music in 1960. She was professor of theory and composition at the University of Maryland 1965-70, and joined the faculty of the University of California (UCSB) in 1971. She is professor emerita, 1991–present.

While at UCSB, Diemer helped to establish the computer/electronic music program.

Notable works
She was composer-in-residence with the Santa Barbara Symphony 1990-92. The symphony premiered 4 of her works:
Concerto in One Movement for Piano (which received a Kennedy Center Friedheim award in 1992), recorded in Volume X of the MMC New Century series of CDs (MMC 2067, released in 1998), performed by Betty Oberacker, soloist, and the Czech RSO led by Vladimir Valek. One of its features is that it sporadically employs dampened piano strings.
Santa Barbara Overture
Homage to Tchaikovsky
Chumash Indian Dance Celebration

Other notable works:

Songs for the Earth, commissioned by the San Francisco Choral Society, performed in Davies Hall, 2005. The work is for chorus and orchestra, with texts by Emily Dickinson, Mary Oliver, Dorothy Diemer Hendry, Omar Khayyam, and Hildegard von Bingen
Fragments from the Mass for chorus, 2 pianos, percussion.
Concerto in One Movement for Marimba (1991), commissioned by the Women's Philharmonic of San Francisco.
Fantasy for Carillon (2009), commissioned by Margo Halsted. It premiered in September 2009, at the 40th anniversary of the Storke Carillon at the University of California, Santa Barbara.

Two important collaborations, among many, with fellow musicians were with Joan Devee Dixon, organist, who commissioned over 50 works for organ and various instruments and instrumental ensembles from Diemer during the 1990s and early 2000, and Philip Ficsor, violinist, who commissioned several violin and piano compositions from Diemer and recorded her complete works for violin and piano and including the concerto for violin (2013).

Awards
 Eastman School of Music
 Yale School of Music
 National Endowment for the Arts
 ASCAP (annually since 1962)
 American Guild of Organists (1995 Composer of the Year)
 Mu Phi Epsilon
 honorary doctorate in 1999 from the University of Central Missouri

Family 
Diemer's parents were George Willis Diemer (1885-1956), American educator, college president, one of a group of American educators who were sent by the U.S. Dept. of State to reorganize the educational system of Japan after World War II; and Myrtle Diemer née Casebolt (1889-1961), church worker and homemaker. Diemer's siblings were poet/teacher Dorothy Diemer Hendry (1918-2006); George Willis Diemer II (1920-1944), Marine fighter pilot, musician/teacher; John Irving Diemer (1920-1964), school principal/musician in Overland Park, KS.

References

External links
Interview with Emma Lou Diemer, April 16, 1988
Interview with Emma Lou Diemer NAMM Oral History Library (2016)
 PIPEDREAMS program featuring Emma Lou Diemer music and interview, January 25, 2010

1927 births
20th-century classical composers
Living people
Musicians from Kansas City, Missouri
Yale School of Music alumni
Eastman School of Music alumni
University of Maryland, College Park faculty
University of California faculty
American women classical composers
American classical composers
Pupils of Paul Hindemith
American women in electronic music
20th-century American women musicians
20th-century American composers
Classical musicians from Missouri
Composers for carillon
20th-century women composers
American women academics
21st-century American women